Ruben Bemelmans and Daniel Masur were the defending champions but lost in the first round to Marc-Andrea Hüsler and Dominic Stricker.

Pierre-Hugues Herbert and Albano Olivetti won the title after defeating Purav Raja and Ramkumar Ramanathan 6–3, 6–4 in the final.

Seeds

Draw

References

External links
 Main draw

Challenger Biel/Bienne - Doubles